Expedition of Zaid ibn Haritha may refer to various expeditions by Zayd ibn Harithah as part of expeditions of prophet Muhammad:

Expedition of Zayd ibn Harithah (Al-Jumum), September 627 AD (AH 6)
Expedition of Zayd ibn Harithah (Wadi al-Qura), November, 627 AD (7th month of 6AH)
Second Expedition of Wadi al-Qura, January, 628 AD, 9th month of 6AH. Raid carried out by Zayd ibn Harithah or Abu Bakr
Expedition of Zayd ibn Harithah (Al-Is), September, 627 AD (5th month of 6AH) 
Expedition of Zayd ibn Harithah (Hisma), October, 628 AD (6th month of 7AH)

See also
Zayd ibn Harithah
List of expeditions of Muhammad